Alsan Putra Masat Sanda (born 1 August 1992) is an Indonesian professional footballer who plays as a full-back and occasionally as a winger for Liga 1 club Bhayangkara. Alsan also is a member of the Regional Police (Polda) in East Nusa Tenggara

Club career

Bali United
Alsan made his debut in the 2015 Sudirman Cup. He was contracted for one year by the club management. and Alsan made his first goal against Arema FC in the Indonesia Soccer Championship. In that match, Alsan scored goal in the 28th minutes.

Bhayangkara
In 2017, Sanda signed a contract with Indonesian Liga 1 club Bhayangkara. He made his debut on 23 April 2017 in a match against Arema. On 13 July 2017, Sanda scored his first goal for Bhayangkara against Madura United in the 72nd minute at the Patriot Stadium, Bekasi.

Career statistics

Club

Honours

Club
Bhayangkara
 Liga 1: 2017

References

External links
 

1992 births
Living people
Indonesian footballers
Bali United F.C. players
Bhayangkara F.C. players
Liga 1 (Indonesia) players
People from Kupang
Sportspeople from East Nusa Tenggara
Association football fullbacks